La Reina High School is a Catholic college preparatory junior and senior high school for girls founded in 1964. La Reina is an independent, private school serving students in Los Angeles and Ventura County.

La Reina's Mission statement is stated below: 

La Reina High School & Middle School is a Catholic college preparatory school for young women in the tradition, vision, and educational principles of the Sisters of Notre Dame.

La Reina provides a nurturing, Catholic environment of educational excellence, focused on helping young women develop into moral and self-confident leaders, who work for the transformation of individuals and society.

Students are given opportunities to foster their relationship with God, to grow intellectually, to develop their individual gifts, and to be catalysts for the promotion of justice locally, nationally and globally.

References

Girls' schools in California
Education in Thousand Oaks, California
High schools in Ventura County, California
Catholic preparatory schools in California
1964 establishments in California
Educational institutions established in 1964
Catholic secondary schools in California